Boogie Woogie was an Indian dance competition television series created and directed by Naved Jaffrey, Ashu Jain and Ravi Behl for Sony Entertainment Television and Sony Entertainment Television Asia. Debuting in 1996, the show was judged by Indian film actor and Television host Javed Jaffrey who was the permanent judge, while his brother Naved, also the director and producer of the show, co hosted the show along with film actor Ravi Behl. The early episodes were shot in Mehta Industrial Estate in Andheri, Mumbai and later, was also shot at other film studios in Mumbai including Natraj, Filmalaya, Filmistaan, Famous, Film City among others. It is the oldest dance reality show on Indian TV and it has become the longest show in India. In the earlier seasons, the judges assigned various themes to episodes, including Bollywood, Horror, Friendship among others. It was also co-hosted by Kadambari Shantshri Desai in season 1 and 2.

The popularity of the dance show has led to the creation of special championship shows, such as Kids' Championships, Teen Championships, Mothers Championships and Celebrity Championships, in which various Indian celebrities, such as Mithun Chakraborty, Juhi Chawla, Esha Deol, Dia Mirza, Govinda, Vivek Oberoi and Ritesh Deshmukh have participated.

Boogie Woogie was among the first shows to start special dance championships catering to different age groups. In the first two seasons, these championships would be one to two episode long and the one winner would be decided at the end of every episode. However, the videos of the seasons are currently not fully available.

Seasons

Season 1
The series' first season premiered in 1996 and ended in 1997.

Season 2
After a long gap of 5–6 years, the show was relaunched by Sony Entertainment Television in 2003 for its 2nd  season. After the end of season 2, Boogie Woogie was off air for sometime in 2006, before it came back in a new avatar in 2008.

During this period, Sony Entertainment Television Asia in London launched the International Boogie Woogie championships. The judging format of this show was created by Samir Bhamra.

Season 3
The show held auditions for its new season contestants from 16 to 20 February 2008 in Mumbai. The new season began on Sony Entertainment Television Asia in mid-March. In the end of February or in the beginning of March 2008, the name of series was prefixed with "Videocon" under a sponsorship deal and was titled Boogie Woogie Little Champs.

Season 4
After the end of the 3rd season, its 4th season was launched in the last week of November 2008.

Season 5
After the end of its 4th season, Sony Entertainment Television again launched the series for its 5th season on 29 May 2009, named Boogie Woogie Mummy's Championship. The series was continuously telecast from February or March 2008 to 3 October 2009, and was replaced by the new dance series Dance Premier League from 9 October 2009. However, the series was said to be return after Dance Premier League ends.

Season 6: 2010
And the series really returned from 19 May 2010 as its 6th season. This season was telecast bi-weekly on every Wednesday and Thursday at 9 PM IST. Its Grand Finale was telecast on 13 August 2010.

Season 7: 2013-2014

Franchise
After completion of seventh season of the show, the show was franchised to Nepal. The rights and necessary requirements was done by AP1 TV of Nepal to import the show. Boogie Woogie Nepal is Nepal's first international franchised dance reality show.

Winners
Sabah Bari (Season 5) 
Sachi Sharma Utah dance group (season 3)
Farhad Shahnawaz
 David Furtado & Sharon Noronha    ( Goa)
Priya Adivarekar (Season 1 and 2)
Nikhil Mishra & Sameer Dave(Season 2- Runners up)
Phulwa Khamkar (Season 1)
Fictitious Dance Group (Season 1)
Jaykumar Nair (Season 3)
Mini and Group (Season 1 and 2)
Kritika Rohira (Season 2)
Yogesh Pathak and company (Season 1 and 2)
Jayshree and group (Season 1 and 2)
Keshav Rathi (Season 2)
pradnya autade (season 7)
Vaishnavi Patil (Season 4 and 5)
Bodyrock Dance Academy, Baroda
Damini Karmerkar
Ruju Parekh (Season 1)

 Neha Marda

Dance appearance
Rohit Pawane

Reception
Throughout the globe, Boogie Woogie Kids Championship received mostly positive critical reception.

See also
 Jhalak Dikhhla Jaa, a celebrity dance show that was aired on Sony Entertainment Television. Now on Colors.
 Nach Baliye, a reality dance show on Star Plus.

References

External links
Official website
Boogie Woogie on SET India
Interview with Ravi Behl

1996 Indian television series debuts
Sony Entertainment Television original programming
Indian dance television shows
Dance competition television shows
2014 Indian television series endings
2000s Indian television series